The Serie D is the top level of semi-professional football in Italy. The fourth tier of the Italian league system, the competition sits beneath the third professional league, Serie C. It is administered by the Lega Nazionale Dilettanti and is organized by the Roman Comitato Interregionale (Interregional Committee), a "league in the league" inside the LND.

History
In 1948 the three leagues running Division 3 (Serie C) had to be reorganized due to an ever-growing number of regional teams.  FIGC decided not to relegate the excess teams to regional championships. It chose the winners and a few runners-up from the 36 Serie C championships to be added to the new third division set up into 4 groups. The rest of the teams joined the new Promozione, which changed its name in 1952 into IV Serie (Fourth Division) and then in 1959 into Serie D.

From 1959 each player in the Serie D championships had to opt for semi-professional status, by signing a specially issued status attribution form. The championship was thus included in the Lega Nazionale Semiprofessionisti, today known as Lega Pro. Serie D was re-organized in 1981 when championships were reduced. The league name changed into the Interregional.  Players lost semi-pro status and converted to amateurs. The championship subsequently passed into the Lega Nazionale Dilettanti. From 1992 to 1999 the name changed into Campionato Nazionale Dilettanti before eventually returning to the current Serie D name. With the merger of the Lega Pro's two divisions at the end of the 2013–14 season (as decided by the FIGC and Lega Pro in November 2012) to reestablish Serie C, Serie D and the leagues below it moved up by one level in the pyramid system, reducing the number of leagues in Italian football to nine.

Structure
Since the early 1990s, Serie D has consisted of 162 teams split into 9 regional divisions (Gironi), usually formed of 18 teams each, divided geographically.

For the 2012–13 season, there were 166 teams.  Two groups (B and C) were formed of 20 teams.  In the 2013–14 season the number was 161 and one group (H) comprised 17 teams. For 2014–15 the distribution by region was as follows:

 Girone A – teams from Aosta Valley, Piedmont, Liguria and Lombardy.
 Girone B – teams from Lombardy and Veneto.
 Girone C – teams from Friuli-Venezia Giulia, Trentino-Alto Adige/Südtirol and Veneto.
 Girone D – teams from Emilia-Romagna, Tuscany and Veneto.
 Girone E – teams from Lazio, Tuscany and Umbria.
 Girone F – teams from Abruzzo, Lazio, Marche and Molise.
 Girone G – teams from Lazio and Sardinia.
 Girone H – teams from Apulia, Basilicata and Campania.
 Girone I – teams from Calabria, Campania and Sicily.

Promotions
The first-placed team from each division is promoted to Serie C each year, replacing 9 teams from Lega Pro relegated to Serie D.

If a newly promoted Serie D team fails to meet the requirements, Lega Pro asks the second-placed team in that Serie D team's division to fill the vacancy. Failing that, the third-placed team may fill the vacancy, and so on.

In recent years, one or more teams from the professional leagues have normally failed to meet the regulatory or financial requirements in order to participate. This usually creates vacancies that get announced in the summer rest period as the new season is being organized. As teams move up to fill the void created by these failed teams or teams in the lowest professional division fail, spaces are created in Serie C (or Lega Pro Seconda Divisione prior to the 2014–15 season) that need to be filled.

For example, in the 2007–08 season there were nine such failures, and thus, nine Lega Pro Seconda Divisione spaces were created. Four of those spaces were filled by calling back teams that had played in Seconda Divisione but were relegated to Serie D for the next season. The other five vacancies were filled by Serie D teams that had participated in the Serie D playoffs.

Playoffs
Playoffs are held at the conclusion of the regular season and involve teams placed second through fifth in each division. The first two rounds are single game elimination matches played at the home of the higher-classified team. Games ending in ties are extended to extra time. Since the 2007–08 season, if games are still tied after extra time, the higher classified team is declared the winner. No penalty shootout takes place.

In round one, for each division, the 5th-placed team is matched against the 2nd-placed team, and the 4th-placed team is matched against the 3rd-placed team. Round two matches together the two winners. At the end of round two, one team from each division survives and the nine winners are grouped into 3 groups of three and play each team in their own group once (one at home and one away). The three group winners qualify for the play-off semi-finals. Since 2007–08, the Coppa Italia Serie D winner qualifies for the 4th semi-final spot. The semi-finals are a two-legged tie, with the winners qualifying for a one-game final match played at a neutral site.

The playoff results provide the league with a list from which it may choose teams to fill vacancies in Serie C. The number of teams promoted through this method can vary each year; for example in 2007–08, the top 5 placed play-off teams were selected to fill vacancies, however, in 2006–07, no teams were needed to fill vacancies.

Relegations Playout

After the regular season is complete, bottom teams in each division play a double-leg series (6th-last vs 3rd-last, 5th-last vs 4th-last). The winners remain in Serie D for the following season.  The two losers are relegated to Eccellenza, a regional amateur league below this, for a total of 4 relegations in each division, 36 in total for the league.

There are no play-out if the difference between 6th-last vs 3rd-last and that between 5th-last vs 4th-last is bigger than eight points.

Tie-Breakers
Serie D does not use head-to-head results to order teams that are tied in points in certain situations, single-game tie-breakers are held at neutral sites instead. Those situations are the following:

 a tie between 1st and 2nd place, where the winner would get a direct promotion to Seconda Divisione and loser qualifies for the play-offs.
 a tie between 5th and 6th place, where only the winner would qualify to participate in the play-offs.
 a tie between 7th-last and 6th-last, where the winner avoids participating in the relegation play-out.
 a tie between 3rd-last and 2nd-last, where the winner qualifies for the relegation play-out and the loser is directly relegated.

Head-to-head results are used in all other situations, such as when all the teams involved are qualified in the promotional playoffs, or all teams are participating in the relegation playoffs.

Scudetto Serie D 

Each year, at the end of the regular season, the winners of the nine Serie D divisions qualify for a championship tournament in order to assign the so-called Scudetto Dilettanti (amateur champions' title).

Round one divides the nine teams into three groups of three teams each where each team plays a single game against each of its other two opponents. The three group winners and best second-placed team advance to the semifinals.

The first scudetto dilettanti was assigned in 1952–1953, when the Serie D was still called IV Serie (fourth division). Its assignment was suspended from 1958–1959 to 1991–1992.

Champions

1952–53 – Catanzaro
1953–54 – Bari
1954–55 – Colleferro
1955–56 – Siena
1956–57 – Sarom Ravenna
1957–58 – Cosenza, Ozo Mantova & Spezia (ex-aequo)
1958–59 – Cascina
1959–60 to 1961–62 – Title assigned to the winning groups of Prima Categoria
1962–63 to 1991–92 – Title not assigned
1992–93 – Eurobuilding Crevalcore
1993–94 – Pro Vercelli
1994–95 – Taranto
1995–96 – Castel San Pietro 
1996–97 – Biellese
1997–98 – Giugliano
1998–99 – Lanciano
1999–2000 – Sangiovannese
2000–01 – Palmese
2001–02 – Olbia
2002–03 – Cavese
2003–04 – Massese
2004–05 – Bassano Virtus
2005–06 – Paganese
2006–07 – Tempio 
2007–08 – Aversa Normanna
2008–09 – Pro Vasto
2009–10 – Montichiari
2010–11 – Cuneo
2011–12 – Venezia
2012–13 – Ischia
2013–14 – Pordenone
2014–15 – Robur Siena
2015–16 – Viterbese
2016–17 – Monza
2017–18 – Pro Patria
2018–19 – Avellino
2019–20 – Not assigned
2020–21 – Not assigned
2021–22 – Recanatese

See also
Italian football league system

Notes

References

External links 
  Official website of the Serie D
  News of Serie D
  Tutti i gironi della serie D su Calciotel

 
5
1948 establishments in Italy
Sports leagues established in 1948
Ita